Pärispea Peninsula is a peninsula in Kuusalu Parish in Harju County, Estonia, 60 km east of the capital Tallinn.

References

Peninsulas of Estonia
Kuusalu Parish
Landforms of Harju County